Zangogho is a town in the Toece Department of Bazèga Province in central Burkina Faso. The town has a population of 1,188.

Geography
Located south-west of the town of Toece nearest towns and villages include Kaongo (1.4 nm), Binsteguere (1.4 nm), Daiassemnore (2.0 nm), Tibe (2.0 nm), Tammsse(3.6 nm), Peno(13.0 nm)
and Zorgho (5.0 nm).

References

External links
Satellite map at Maplandia.com

Populated places in the Centre-Sud Region
Bazèga Province